Dahlberg is a locational or ornamental Swedish surname based on the location where the original name's bearers lived.  Translated directly from Swedish to English means Dal meaning "Valley" and berg meaning "Mountain".

Notable people 
Notable people with the surname include:
Anton Dahlberg (1985), Swedish sailor
Arthur C. Dahlberg (1896–1964), American dairy scientist
Edward Dahlberg  (1900–1977), American novelist and essayist
Edwin T. Dahlberg  (1892–1986), American peace maker and church leader
Erik Dahlbergh (1625–1703), Swedish count, engineer, soldier, and field marshal
Erik Dahlberg Secondary School
Gotthard A. Dahlberg (1884-1948), American politician
Gregory R. Dahlberg (1951), American Secretary of the Army
Gunhild Dahlberg (1975), Norwegian television presenter, journalist, and author
Gunnar Dahlberg  (1893–1956), Swedish physician, eugenist and geneticist
Ingetraut Dahlberg (1927–2017), German information scientist and philosopher
Ingrid Dahlberg (1941), Swedish Theater Manager and President of Dramaten (Swedish Royal Dramatic Theatre)
Heléne Dahlberg (born 1971), Swedish biathlete
Hjalmar Dahlberg (1886-1962), Swedish runner
James Dahlberg, American scientist
Johan Dahlberg (1987), Swedish ice hockey player
Jonas Dahlberg (1970), Swedish artist
Kenneth C. Dahlberg, American engineer and corporate executive
Kenneth H. Dahlberg (1917-2011), American businessman and World War II fighter ace
Linda Dahlberg, American public health researcher
Mae Dahlberg  (1888–1969), Australian music hall and vaudeville performer
Mikael Dahlberg (1985), Swedish soccer player
Nathan Dahlberg (1964), New Zealand professional cyclist
Nicklas Dahlberg (1985), Swedish professional ice hockey goaltender
Olle Dahlberg (1928–1997), Swedish speed skater who competed in the 1956 Winter Olympics
Ragnar Dahlberg (1943), Swedish television presenter and producer
Sandra Dahlberg (1979), Swedish singer
Theodor Dahlberg (1884-1963), Swedish wrestler
Tove Dahlberg (1973), Swedish singer
Wesley P. Dahlberg (1918),  American automobile designer

References 

Swedish-language surnames